The Tour Championship of Canada is an annual golf tournament played on PGA Tour Canada, commonly known as the Canadian Tour. It is the last tournament played in the season, and in 2022 had a purse of C$225,000. 

The tournament was founded in 2002 as the Bay Mills Open, hosted at the Bay Mills Resort in Brimley, Michigan, United States, and became designated as the Canadian Tour's "Players Championship" the following year. In 2006, the tournament moved to Ontario, Canada as the new Canadian Tour Championship. It has since remained in Ontario, and adopted different names under various title sponsors.

In 2015, it was an event reserved for those in the top 60 on the PGA Tour Canada money list. All players in this tournament retain PGA Tour Canada status. It is also a final chance to finish in the top five on the Order of Merit to earn Korn Ferry Tour cards or at least improve their position for qualifying school.

Winners
Fortinet Cup Championship
2022  Wil Bateman
2020–21 No tournament

Canada Life Championship
2019  Patrick Fishburn

Freedom 55 Financial Championship
2018  Danny Walker
2017  Rico Hoey
2016  Paul Barjon
2015  Jason Millard

Tour Championship of Canada
2014  Ryan Williams
2013  Max Gilbert

Canadian Tour Championship
2012  Eugene Wong
2011  Stuart Anderson
2010  Aaron Goldberg
2009  James Love
2008  Tom Stankowski
2007  Bret Guetz
2006  Stuart Anderson

Bay Mills Open Players Championship
2005  Michael Harris
2004  Chris Wisler
2003  Rodney Butcher

Bay Mills Open
2002  Jeff Quinney

References

External links
Coverage on the PGA Tour Canada's official site

PGA Tour Canada events
Golf tournaments in Ontario
Recurring sporting events established in 2002
Golf in Michigan